Bob Lee may refer to:

Sportspeople
Bob Lee (Australian footballer) (1927–2001), SANFL football administrator
Bob Lee (baseball) (1937–2020), baseball pitcher
Bob Lee (footballer, born 1953), English footballer
Bob Lee (guard) (1935–2017), American football player
Bob Lee (quarterback) (born 1946), former American football player

Others 
Bob Lee, deceased oil producer, known for the construction of the Cape Romano Dome House
Bob Lee, character in The Airmail Mystery

See also
Bob Ley (born 1955), American sports anchor and reporter
Bobby Lee (disambiguation)
Robert Lee (disambiguation)